Mikhail Aleksandrovich Dmitriyev (born 27 January 1975) is a Russian professional football coach and a former player. Currently, he is an assistant manager with FC Sokol Saratov.

As a player, he made his debut in the Soviet Second League in 1991 for FC Sokol Saratov.

References

1975 births
Sportspeople from Saratov
Living people
Soviet footballers
Russian footballers
Association football midfielders
FC Sokol Saratov players
FC Khimik-Arsenal players
Russian football managers
FC Sokol Saratov managers